Prephenate dehydrogenase is an enzyme found in the shikimate pathway, and helps catalyze the reaction from prephenate to tyrosine.

Nomenclature 
Gene: (Saccharomyces Cerevisiae) TYR1

Shikimate pathway: Arogenate/Prephenate (ADH/PDH). Although in the shikimate pathway arogenate and prephenate dehydrogenase catalyze different reactions, they can at times be used interchangeably.
 TyrA (tyrosine A: within the tyrosine pathway)
 Prephenate dehydrogenase
 Prephenate (Nicotinamide adenine dinucleotide phosphate) dehydrogenase
 Prephenate dehydrogenase (NADP)
 NADP+ oxidoreductase

Homology 
This enzyme so far has been found in sixteen different organisms; twelve different kinds of bacteria (mostly cyanobacteria) and four different kinds of plants (mostly different kinds of beans).

Bacteria organisms (examples): Acenitobacter calcoaceticus, Fischerella sp., Flavobacterium so., Comamonas testosteroni, and nostoc sp.

Plant organisms: phaseolus coccineus, phaseolus vulgaris, vicia faba, vigna radiata

Function 
Present in the shikimate pathway, in the pathway to synthesize tyrosine (a non-essential amino acid in both plants and animals). It catalyzes the oxidative decarboxylation reaction of prephenate to 4-hydroxyphenylpyruvate.

Reaction 

In enzymology, a prephenate dehydrogenase is an enzyme that catalyzes the chemical reaction
 prephenate + NAD+  4-hydroxyphenylpyruvate + CO2 + NADH

Thus, the two substrates of this enzyme are prephenate and NAD+, whereas its 3 products are 4-hydroxyphenylpyruvate, CO2, and NADH.

Structure 
This enzyme belongs to the family of oxidoreductases, specifically those acting on the CH-CH group of donor with NAD+ or NADP+ as acceptor.  The systematic name of this enzyme class is prephenate:NAD+ oxidoreductase (decarboxylating). Other names in common use include hydroxyphenylpyruvate synthase, and chorismate mutase---prephenate dehydrogenase.  This enzyme participates in phenylalanine, tyrosine and tryptophan biosynthesis and novobiocin biosynthesis.

Also found in haemophilus influenzae, synechocystis (bacteria), and aquifex aeolicus (plant).

However, in haemophilus influenzae, prephenate dehydrogenase is fused with the enzyme chorismate mutase. This fusion is not found in plants or animals.

Structural studies 

References 

Enzymes of known structure
EC 1.3.1
NADH-dependent enzymes